Duan Xi (died  110) was the last Protector General of the Western Regions during the Han Dynasty. He was appointed in 108.

See also
Battle of Yiwulu

References

110 deaths
Han dynasty generals
Year of birth unknown